Scent Dance III ( 香之舞 III ) is a work
for string quartet, composed by He Xuntian in 2011.

Summary
Scent Dance III was commissioned for the 2011 4th Beijing International Music 
Competition - String quartet Competition and included in the list of required repertoire.

Inspiration
Scent Dance III was inspired from Xuntian He’s poem Passing By the Earth (1999).

References

External links
Scent Dance III published by Schott Musik International, Germany

Compositions by He Xuntian
Compositions for string quartet
2011 compositions